Coentrão is a Portuguese family name and can refer to the following people:

 Fábio Coentrão (born 1988), Portuguese former football defender
 José Carlos Coentrão Marafona (born 1987), Portuguese football goalkeeper
 Rui Coentrão (born 1992), Portuguese football defender

Portuguese-language surnames